Character dance is a specific subdivision of classical dance.  It is the stylized representation of a traditional folk or national dance, mostly from European countries, and uses movements and music which have been adapted for the theater.

Character dance is integral to much of the classical ballet repertoire.  A good example of character dance within ballet is the series of national dances which take place at the beginning of Act II of Swan Lake. The ballet Don Quixote also features many character variations based on  traditional Spanish dances. Popular character dance adaptations for ballet also include the national dances of Hungary , Russia, Poland, Italy and Spain: csárdás, mazurka, tarantella, flamenco, etc. 

One of the best known schools that incorporate character dance to teaching syllabus is Vaganova Ballet Academy. Outside of Russia and the former republics of the late Soviet Union, there is little training in the art of character dance. However, it is still widely taught in the United Kingdom and Australia and in Central Europe (Czech Republic, Hungary) where it is integral to the training of students at the Royal Ballet School and the Australian Ballet School.  It is also taught as a separate skill within the graded examinations syllabus of the Royal Academy of Dance, Statni Konzervator Praha.  Most performing companies or schools elsewhere are not familiar with the history or technique of this style. Therefore, the term character dance is often used in misleading ways that have no bearing to the original definition in ballet terminology.

Yuri Slonimsky writes in his book The Bolshoi Ballet (Second edition 1960, p.8) on the history of character dance:

Folk traditions have been incorporated into what is known as ballet for centuries but it was not until Aleksandr Shirayev, Assistant to Marius Petipa, that character dance became a unique and codified art-form that takes its rightful place as an integral part of classical ballet.

Character dances are usually performed in shoes or boots, with a suede sole and a small heel.  Men typically wear black character shoes and women typically wear a flesh coloured shoe with a larger, more feminine heel, but sometimes black shoes too.

See also
Grotesque dance

References

Ballet